Espeseth Cove is a hamlet in Saskatchewan.

Fertile Belt No. 183, Saskatchewan
Unincorporated communities in Saskatchewan
Division No. 5, Saskatchewan